Canna 'Austria' is a medium sized Italian Group Canna cultivar with green foliage, oblong shaped, upright habit; oval stems, coloured green; flowers are cupped, self-coloured yellow, throat orange-red spots on yellow, staminodes are large; seed is sterile, pollen is low fertile; rhizomes are long and thin, coloured white; tillering is prolific. Introduced by C. Sprenger, Dammann & Co., Naples, Italy, EU in 1893.

Announced along with C. 'Italia', and caused much interest as their large flowers were considered to be a major breakthrough.

The breeding is Canna 'Madame Crozy' x Canna flaccida 'Le Roi'.

Gallery

Synonyms
 ''Canna 'Austra' Canna 'Canary Bird' Canna 'King Midas' Canna 'Lemon Zest' Canna 'Richard Wallace' - a totally different Crozy Group cultivar.
 Canna'' 'Souvenir de Jeanne'

References
 Garden and forest. / Volume 9, Issue 424. [April 8, 1896, 141-150]
 RHS Canna trials 1908

External links
 Canna News: Comparison of Crozy and Italian Groups
 Austria in the Claines Canna Collection

See also
 Canna
 List of Canna species
 List of Canna cultivars

Cannaceae
Ornamental plant cultivars